The Bahar-i Danish ('Spring of Knowledge') was a Persian collection of romantic tales adapted from earlier Indian sources by Inayat Allah Kamboh of Lahore in 1061 A.H./1651.

The book was partially translated into English by Alexander Dow in 1768 or 1769, and Jonathan Scott translated it completely in 1799. The Persian text was also lithographed several times in the 19th century.

One of the tales in the Bahar-i Danish provided Thomas Moore with the plot of his 1817 verse-novel Lalla-Rookh.

No early illustrated copy of the manuscript has survived, though a pair of 18th-century illustrated manuscripts, from the collections of the Duke of Northumberland and that of Richard Johnson, may reflect 17th-century illustrative traditions.

Translations
 Bahar-Danush; or, garden of knowledge. An oriental romance. Translated from the Persic of Einaiut Oollah by Jonathan Scott, 1799. Digital version at the Packard Humanities Institute

References

External links
 ʿInāyat-Allāh Kanbū, Šayḫ d. 1082/1671

1651 books
17th-century Indian books
Persian-language books
Indian romantic fiction
Indian folklore
Indian literature
Indian legends
18th-century manuscripts
Islamic illuminated manuscripts
Indian manuscripts